Oyshee (full name Oyshee Fatima Tuz Zahra) is a Bangladeshi singer. She is notable for her albums Oyshee Express, Oyshee's Maya, Oyshee's Haowa, Chokher Bari, Oyshee Express2, Oyshee Express3, GB Dilki Doya Hoyna, GB Dillite Nizamuddin Awolia  with Imran Mahmudul and Dehobazi with Arfin Rumey. She won Bangladesh National Film Award for Best Female Playback Singer for her performance in the film Maya: The Lost Mother (2019).

Career
Oyshee learned music from 'Rangpur Shishu Academy'. In 2002, she participated in NTV show 'Shapla Kuri'. She became 2nd Runner-up. Later, she published her first album 'Oyshee Express', composed by Imran Mahmudul, which became a breakthrough hit. In 2017, she sang the song "Neelima", composed by Imran Mahmudul and written by Robiul Islam Jibon. In 2016, her second album “Maya” released on the Noboborsho (14 April). The music director was Belal Khan and the songs are “Maya”, “Ochin Taan”, “Naalish”, “Din-e Din-e” and “Ari”. They were written by Anurup Aich, Shomeshwar Oli and Robiul Islam Jibon. she recorded a folk song "Kajol Bhromora" as a featured artist alongside Adit Ozbert, it became popular. "Dil Ki Doya Hoyna" and "Tumi Chokh Mele Takale" are other successful songs by her in that period. In February 2018, she signed a contract with Indian record label Shree Venkatesh Films, becoming the youngest Bangladeshi singer to do so. Besides, she is a doctor. She started her profession as a Medical Officer of CCU at the department of Cardiology at MH Samorita Hospital and Medical College in Dhaka.

Discography

Albums
 Oyshee Express
 Maya
 Hawa
 Chokher Bari
 Dehobazi

Singles

Awards and nominations
 Best singer;– "Symphony Channel i music award" – 2016
 Best emerging singer;– "Bachsas Awards" – 2016
 Best singer popular choice;– "Bachsas Awards" – 2018
Best Female Playback Singer;- 44th Bangladesh National Film Award" -2019

References

External links
 
 
 

Bangladeshi playback singers
21st-century Bangladeshi women singers
Living people
People from Noakhali District
Year of birth missing (living people)
Best Female Playback Singer National Film Award (Bangladesh) winners